Guillermo Martín Campra Elizalde (born in Barcelona, Spain, on 11 March 1997) is a Spanish actor.

Filmography

Television
El Internado (2008 - 2009)
Águila Roja (2009–Present)
Boca Norte (2018–Present)
Elite (2022)

Films
Carlitos y el Campo de los Sueños (2008)
Águila Roja, la película (2011)

Awards
2009 Best New Actor: Festival de Televisión y Cine Histórico del Reino de León
2009 Best Actor: Festival Internacional de Cine Infantil Santo Domingo
2012 Best Young Actor in an International Feature Film: Young Artist Award - Nominated

References

External links

Official Web Site

1997 births
Living people
Spanish male film actors
Spanish male television actors
Spanish male child actors
21st-century Spanish male actors
People from Barcelona